Robert M. Duncan Jr. (born 1978) is an American attorney who served as the United States Attorney in the United States District Court for the Eastern District of Kentucky from 2017 to 2021.

Early life and education 
Duncan was born in Ashland, Kentucky and raised in Inez, Kentucky along the Kentucky-West Virginia border. He is the son of Mike Duncan, an attorney serving as Chairman of the Board of Governors of the United States Postal Service and former Chair of the Republican National Committee. He graduated from Sheldon Clark High School in 1996.  In 2000 he graduated from Centre College earning a B.A. in English and a minor in History. In 2003, Duncan received his J.D. from University of Kentucky College of Law.

Career 
After law school, Duncan served as a law clerk for Henry Rupert Wilhoit Jr. of the United States District Court for the Eastern District of Kentucky. Duncan served as an Assistant United States Attorney for the United States District Court for the Eastern District of Kentucky from 2005 until 2017. Serving as an Assistant United States Attorney, he prosecuted complex drug trafficking, money laundering, firearms offenses, and violent crime. From 2007 to 2013, he served as coordinator of the Project Safe Neighborhoods Program and also served as the Professional Responsibility Officer for his office.

Duncan was nominated for United States Attorney for the Eastern District of Kentucky by President Donald Trump on August 3, 2017, confirmed by the Senate on November 9, 2017, and was sworn in by Karen Caldwell, Chief Judge of the Eastern District of Kentucky, on November 21, 2017. He resigned on January 24, 2021.

It February 2021, it was announced that Duncan would enter the private sector becoming a partner at the Dinsmore law firm in Lexington, Kentucky.

References

External links
 Biography at U.S. Department of Justice

1978 births
Living people
Assistant United States Attorneys
Centre College alumni
Kentucky lawyers
People from Ashland, Kentucky
United States Attorneys for the Eastern District of Kentucky
University of Kentucky College of Law alumni
21st-century American lawyers